The Yakovlev AIR-11, also known as Yakovlev LT-1, was a 3-seat low-wing touring cabin monoplane designed by A.S. Yakovlev in the USSR, circa 1936.

Design and development
Reportedly inspired by the Percival Gull, Yakovlev designed and built a similar aircraft using his tried and tested structural formulae of wooden wings, fabric covered steel tube fuselage with fabric covered D1 (Duralumin) tail section and control surfaces. The fixed tail-wheel undercarriage was spatted and fitted with trousers, with a spring steel tail-skid, or, alternatively, on skis.

Pilot and first passenger sat side by side under an upward-folding hood with the second passenger in a seat to the rear.

Operational history
First flown in late 1936, the AIR-11 took part in sporting air races held on 24 July 1937 winning second place in the two-seat section.

After Sergei Ilyushin expressed his interest in the aircraft Yakovlev presented the aircraft to him, for commuting from Moscow to Voronezh. The aircraft crashed some time later, at the hands of Ilyushin, after a mechanic neglected to fill the oil tank, causing the engine to fail in flight.

Specifications

References

1930s Soviet civil aircraft
AIR-11
Single-engined tractor aircraft
Low-wing aircraft
Aircraft first flown in 1936